Russkaya Urginka (Urıś Ürgene) is a rural locality (a village) in Novopetrovsky Selsoviet, Zianchurinsky District, Bashkortostan, Russia. The population was 20 as of 2010. There is 1 street.

Geography 
Russkaya Urginka is located 9 km north of Isyangulovo (the district's administrative centre) by road. Simbirsky is the nearest rural locality.

References 

Rural localities in Zianchurinsky District